Cunego is an Italian surname. Notable people with the surname include:

Damiano Cunego (born 1981), Italian cyclist
Domenico Cunego (1724/25–1803), Italian printmaker

See also
Cuneo (surname)

Italian-language surnames